Quest was an American brand of cigarettes manufactured by Vector Tobacco and available in the United States from 2002-2010. It was manufactured using genetically altered tobacco plants.

The product was available in three versions. Quest 1, Quest 2, and Quest 3.

Each version of the product contained a different amount of nicotine.

Quest 1 was reported to have of .6 mg of nicotine. Quest 2 was reported to have of .3 mg of nicotine. Quest 3 was reported to have only traced amounts of nicotine (.05 mg).

The manufacturer stressed that Quest cigarettes contained all the unhealthy carcinogens and had the same side effects of a regular cigarette, with the single exception of reduced nicotine levels.

References

External links 

Cigarette brands